Divis is a hill and area of sprawling moorland north-west of Belfast in County Antrim, Northern Ireland. With a height of 1,568 ft (478 m), it is the highest of the Belfast Hills. It is joined with the neighbouring Black Mountain, and in the past they may have been seen as one. Divis transmitting station is on the summit. The mountain extends north to the Antrim Plateau and shares its geology; consisting of a basaltic cover underlain by limestone and lias clay.

Only recently have the Divis area and its surrounding mountains been handed over to the National Trust; from 1953 to 2005, it was under the control of the Ministry of Defence. It was also used as a training area for the British Army. It might have been released earlier, but due to the period of unrest known as the Troubles, the British Government and military viewed the area as a useful vantage point, overlooking Belfast.

References

External links
 BBC - Divis Mountain wins "space award"
 BBC - Beacon of hope on city's mountain
 National Trust

Marilyns of Northern Ireland
Mountains and hills of County Antrim
Geography of Belfast
Volcanism of Northern Ireland